NBC 22 may refer to:

WWLP, TV station in Springfield, Massachusetts
KFSA-TV, former TV station (now KFSM-TV on channel 5) in Fort Smith, Arkansas (1953 to 1958)
WJCL, former TV station in Savannah, Georgia (1982 to 1985)
WKEF, former TV station in Dayton, Ohio (1980 to 2004)